William "Bud" Boone (November 9, 1931 – February 12, 2010) was a NASCAR driver from Warren, Ohio.

Boone competed in one Cup event in 1950 when he raced at Funk's Speedway. 
He finished 9th in his only race (see stats).

References

2010 deaths
NASCAR drivers
Sportspeople from Warren, Ohio
Racing drivers from Ohio
1931 births